Persatuan Sepakbola Waropen (commonly known as Persewar) is an Indonesian football club based in Waropen Regency, Papua, Indonesia. Persewar Waropen has several nickname, namely The Mangrove Pearl. On 22 December 2018, they secured a promotion to Liga 2 from Liga 3.

History
Persewar Waropen was established in 2005, from the year the club was founded until 2009, Persewar Waropen played in the Liga Indonesia Third Division. Persewar won the Liga Indonesia Third Division in the 2009–2010 season.

In the 2018 season, Persewar Waropen managed to get promoted to Liga 2 after being runner-up in the 2018 Liga 3 Papua zone and qualifying for the National Round of Liga 3. In the national round of Top 8 will be held at the Brawijaya Stadium. Persewar Waropen successfully finished third in the East Group and promoted to Liga 2 next season.

In the 2019 season, Persewar Waropen officially appointed former Indonesia national team player, Elie Aiboy as head coach of the club, previously he was assistant coach last season.

Players

Current squad

Naturalized players

Coaching staff

Achievements and honours

References

External links

Sport in Papua (province)
Football clubs in Indonesia
Football clubs in Papua (province)
Association football clubs established in 2005
2005 establishments in Indonesia